Delfzijl West is a railway station located in Delfzijl, Netherlands. It is located on the Groningen–Delfzijl railway between Appingedam and Delfzijl. The station was opened on 1 June 1969. The train services are operated by Arriva.

History 
The Groningen–Delfzijl railway was opened in 1884. Train services at this railway station started on 1 June 1969.

Services 
The train services are currently operated by Arriva. The following local service calls at Delfzijl West twice per hour:
Stoptrein 37700: Groningen – Groningen Noord – Sauwerd – Bedum – Stedum – Loppersum – Appingedam – Delfzijl West – Delfzijl

References

External links 
 
 Delfzijl West station, station information

Transport in Eemsdelta
Railway stations in Groningen (province)
Railway stations opened in 1968